The Indo-Scythians were named "Shaka" in India, an extension on the name Saka used by the Persians to designate Scythians. From the time of the Mahabharata wars (3500-3000 BCE) the Shakas had numerous mentions in texts like the Puranas, the Manusmriti, the Ramayana, the Mahabharata, the Mahabhasiya of Patanjali, the Brhat Samhita of Vraha Mihira, the Kavyamimamsa of Rajashekhara, the Brihat-Katha-Manjari, the Katha-Sarit-Sagara and several other old texts. They are described as part of an amalgam of other war-like tribes from the northwest.

Atri Smriti reference
In his Book of Law (Atri-Smriti or Atri-Samhita), Rsi Atri regards the Sakas, Kambojas, Yavanas, Khasas, Parasikas, Natas, Svapakas etc. as Mlechchas (barbarians) and forbids receiving any gifts from or eating the food of or having any kinds of contacts or connections with them.

See also
Ancient India and Central Asia
Mlecchas

References

Indian literature|India
Saka